Skywarn Europe is a network of volunteer storm spotters throughout Europe based on the U.S. Skywarn program (a similar program, Canwarn operates in Canada).

Its members attend severe weather training courses and deliver real-time observations of current weather conditions that may be used to warn the public. Its postings may afterwards be entered into databases to evaluate meteorologists' forecasts.

The organization has autonomous branches in Germany, Austria, Switzerland, France, Slovenia, Netherlands, Czech Republic, Slovakia, Poland, and the United Kingdom.

See also 
 European Severe Storms Laboratory
 TORRO

References

External links 
 Skywarn Europe
 European Storm Forecast Experiment
 TorDACH
 

Emergency communication
Meteorological data and networks
Disaster preparedness in Europe